The Bluebell Railway is an  heritage line almost entirely in West Sussex in England, except for Sheffield Park which is in East Sussex. It is managed by the Bluebell Railway Preservation Society.

It is the first preserved standard gauge steam-operated passenger railway in the world to operate a public service. The society ran its first train on 7 August 1960, less than three years after the line from East Grinstead to Lewes had been closed by British Railways.

On 23 March 2013, the Bluebell Railway started to run through to its new  terminus station. At East Grinstead there is a connection to the national rail network, the first connection of the Bluebell Railway to the national network in 50 years, since the Horsted Keynes –  line closed in 1963.

Today the railway is managed and run largely by volunteers. Having preserved a number of steam locomotives even before steam stopped running on British mainline railways in 1968, today it has over 30 steam locomotives, the 2nd largest collection in the UK after the National Railway Museum. The Bluebell also has almost 150 carriages and wagons, most of them pre-1939.

History 
In 1877 an act of Parliament authorised construction of the Lewes and East Grinstead Railway (L&EGR). The line was sponsored by local landowners, including the Earl of Sheffield. A year later another act enabled the London, Brighton and South Coast Railway Company (LB&SCR), chaired by Samuel Laing, to acquire and operate the line.

The line had six stations, but only Barcombe was within walking distance of a village. It was customary for a rural line supported by a company or individuals to have stations close to the residences of its sponsors. Thus Sheffield Park station was built for the Earl of Sheffield, and Newick and Chailey for Newick Park and Reedens, the homes of two other sponsors.

The 1877 and 1878 acts included a clause that:

This imposed a legal requirement to provide a service, and the only way to remove this obligation was to pass another act.

Designed under instructions from LB&SCR Chief Engineer Frederick Banister, the line was constructed to take double track. However, only the section between East Grinstead and Horsted Keynes (and thence to Haywards Heath via Ardingly) was laid as such; south of the junction at Horsted Keynes the line was single track with passing loops at stations. The line was opened in 1882.

Goods traffic on the line consisted of local produce; milk: farm products and coal, and timber to and from Albert Turner & Son, a sawmill. The only time Sheffield Park received a substantial number of passengers was when Lord Sheffield entertained the Australian cricket team, with a match between them and Lord Sheffield's own team.

Accident
On 31 July 1943, newlyweds Ronald Knapp and Winifred Standing were killed when they were pulled under a train from Lewes to East Grinstead. The couple walked along the railway on a dark rainy night. When the train got to Horsted Keynes, the guard found a raincoat covered with blood on the engine. Another coat was found near two bodies in the middle of the tracks. The ganger who found them told the inquest the couple must have been walking with their backs to the train.

"There was a very heavy squall at the time and the couple would probably have not heard a thing," he said. The coroner said Ronald and Winifred were trespassing and no blame could be attached to any railway worker. Little more than a week after they were married, the couple's funeral was at St Giles' Church, Horsted Keynes, where they are buried together in a grave marked by a War Graves Commission headstone.

Closure
In 1954, long before the Beeching Axe, the branch line committee of British Railways proposed closing the line from East Grinstead to Culver Junction near Lewes. This was challenged by local residents, but closure was agreed in February 1955 for 15 June 1955, although the line closed on 29 May due to a rail strike. An acrimonious battle between British Railways and the users of the Bluebell Line then ensued, and lasted three years.

Shortly after closure, Margery Bessemer of Chailey discovered in the 1877 and 1878 acts the clause relating to the "Statutory Line", and demanded British Railways reinstate services. On 7 August 1956 British Railways reopened the line, with trains stopping at stations mentioned in the acts. British Railways took the case to the House of Commons in 1957, resulting in a public inquiry. British Railways were censured, but later the Transport Commission persuaded Parliament to repeal the special section of the act. By this means the line was finally closed on 17 March 1958.

Preservation

On 15 March 1959 a group that included the future president of the society, Bernard Holden, met in Ardingly and formed the Lewes and East Grinstead Railway Preservation Society. The society elected John Leroy as the first chairman, and £940 was raised in donations to start the society. On a vote at the meeting, the society changed its name to the Bluebell Railway Preservation Society.

The society's initial aim was to reopen the whole line from East Grinstead to Culver Junction as a commercial service, using a two-car DMU. The plans came to nothing: the society failed to buy the whole line, and most local residents were not interested. The committee then recommended that the stretch of track between Sheffield Park and Horsted Keynes could be run as a tourist attraction, with vintage locomotives and stock operated by unpaid volunteer staff.

Sheffield Park to Horsted Keynes
As BR still ran an electrified line from Horsted Keynes to Ardingly, the society leased a stretch of track from BR just south of this. In 1962 the society extended services to Horsted Keynes. Also in 1962 a halt was opened at Holywell (Waterworks). However, this was closed the following year. BR withdrew passenger services from Horsted Keynes to Haywards Heath in 1963; and with complete closure of the line north of Horsted Keynes, the Bluebell Line was severed from the BR system.

Horsted Keynes to Kingscote
In 1974 the society purchased the freehold of the demolished West Hoathly station, allowing the first steps to be taken towards an extension northwards towards East Grinstead station. It then purchased the freehold of the site of Kingscote station in January 1985. These efforts culminated in a public inquiry, with the Secretaries of State for the Environment and Transport giving planning permission and a Light Railway Order for an extension to East Grinstead in 1985.

At the north end of Sharpthorne Tunnel, the line passes through the site of the former West Hoathly railway station. It was demolished in 1967, but remains of the platforms and goods dock are still visible.

2010 marked the Bluebell's 50th anniversary of running trains. To mark the event, the railway held a gala over 6–8 August 2010 with all available home engines and two visitor engines. Some of the society's founder members gathered at Horsted Keynes to mark the arrival of a commemorative LB&SCR A1X class No.55 Stepney-hauled steam train. The entourage then travelled towards Sheffield Park.

Kingscote to East Grinstead via Imberhorne

From its inception, the society had always planned to work northwards towards East Grinstead, where the line would connect with the national network. BR donated Imberhorne Viaduct to the railway in 1992, but the purchase of the final pieces of the by then privately owned track bed north to East Grinstead was only completed in 2003, allowing physical civil engineering activity to be undertaken from that year.

A major problem was the former landfill site in the  cutting just south of Imberhorne Viaduct.

The excavated clay-cap covering the landfill site was taken south by rail, to fill the site of a removed viaduct and embankment on the old Ardingly spur. In January 2008 agreement was given to start clearing foliage on the section of the tip between Imberhorne Lane and Hill Place bridges. In a public launch event, BBC newsreader Nicholas Owen—a local resident and society volunteer—started removal of the actual waste on 25 November 2008.

Initially rubbish was removed from the site by lorry, but, due to the substantial volume and cost of about £45/tonne, in 2009 a trial removal of spoil by rail was carried out by DB Schenker Rail (UK). At £25,000 per train and now undertaken by GB Railfreight, this practice continued periodically as funds became available. However, an increase in the landfill tax was announced in 2008, and this was due to take effect from April 2012. It would increase the cost of removal from £25/tonne to £90/tonne. So the society formed an appeal to complete the removal of the landfill waste by the end of March 2012. With the receiving site changed to Appleford, Oxfordshire and thanks to the "tenner for the tip" appeal, the cash target was met and the rubbish was removed by rail in time.

At the railway's 50th anniversary celebration weekend in 2010, East Sussex resident Dame Vera Lynn launched a £3.8 million appeal; the greater part of this amount would be put towards reconnecting the line to East Grinstead. Mid Sussex District Council responded with a one-off donation of £50,000 towards the reconnection.

On 7 March 2013, the last section of track was formally joined using a white fishplate, with the honour of tightening the four bolts being given to Barbara Watkins, a long-standing Bluebell Railway volunteer. The extension to East Grinstead was officially opened on Saturday 23 March, with a two-week opening festival starting that day.

West: Horsted Keynes to Haywards Heath via Ardingly

Originally built as a double-track line, it was electrified in the 1930s, with 2-NOL units used for the Seaford-Horsted Keynes service. The line between Horsted Keynes and Ardingly was operated as single-track in its final years, with 2-BIL/Class 401 and 2-HAL/Class 402 units. The second track was left in place and used for carriage storage, most notably the new Kent Coast electric stock prior to its introduction and later the steam-hauled stock that it replaced.

After the line's closure in 1963, the trackbed was purchased in its entirety by a member of the local gentry. In the 1990s the society bought the abandoned trackbed west between Horsted Keynes and Ardingly from his estate. This included up to the Hanson Aggregates depot built on the former Ardingly railway station site.

The society plans to reconnect the line with Network Rail at Copyhold Junction, to allow access to the London to Brighton Main Line. Stations could either be located at Copyhold or Haywards Heath. There is a proposal that the line could be restored as third rail electrified, allowing operation of the society's electric stock.

While the  Lywood Tunnel remains in good condition, there are two major areas of work that would be required to re-open the line, these being the replacement of a short girder-bridge span bridge and the  Sheriff Mill Viaduct, which was demolished in 1969. The removed clay-cap from Imberhorne cutting has been deposited on the banks of the former Sherriff Mill viaduct to allow later bridging of the gap. Also in 2013, the former Tewkesbury and Malvern Railway bridge that crossed over the M50 motorway were donated to the railway for eventual installation in the replacement bridge.

South: Sheffield Park to Lewes
 
By the late Victorian era, Lewes station was the convergence point of three lines from the East Sussex coast and three lines to the north all of which reached London via Croydon. Today, Lewes has a line to the north which joins the Brighton main Line at Burgess Hill and from there on to Gatwick Airport, East Croydon and London, a line west towards Brighton, a line south to Newhaven and Seaford, and a line east to Eastbourne, Hastings and Ashford.

Originally the Bluebell Line was the straightest and quickest route from Lewes to London. At Culver Junction it joined the 1858 Wealden Line (part of which is now restored as the nearby Heritage Lavender Line), thereby gaining access to Lewes. The section from East Grinstead to Culver Junction was closed in 1958, and the Lewes to Uckfield line in 1969 by British Rail.

Bluebell supporters and committee members have expressed interest in re-building the line south by three more stations to Lewes. However, a substantial number of large civil engineering obstacles and intrusions onto the former trackbed make this a difficult project to envisage the completion of. For execution, the project would require:
The bridging of the raised, widened and re-aligned A275 road immediately south of Sheffield Park
The re-excavation of waste-infill under the former road bridges just south of Sheffield Park and Barcombe stations
The in-filling since of the cutting and former route under the A272 road
The re-excavation of waste-infill at the former , which includes industrial waste producing large amounts of methane gas discharges
The fact that a large private housing estate has been built on and surrounding the former Newick and Chailey site
The remaining undeveloped line from Lewes to Sheffield Park has been safeguarded as a bridleway and footpath.

Stations 

The various stations have been restored to show different periods of the railway's life:
Sheffield Park has been restored to a Victorian ambience, as it would have appeared during the time of the London, Brighton and South Coast Railway (up to 1922)
Horsted Keynes emulates the Southern Railway from 1923 to 1947
West Hoathly (if built) will emulate the British Railways of the late 1940s
Kingscote echoes the British Railways of the 1950s
 East Grinstead is an amalgam of British Railways of the 1950s and 1960s

Heritage railway
East Grinstead to Sheffield Park
East Grinstead

 (closed)

 Bluebell Halt (closed)
 Holywell (Waterworks) (closed)
 Freshfield Halt (closed)
 Ketches Halt (closed)

Horsted Keynes to Ardingly (proposed)

 (proposed)

Original stations 
Lewes to East Grinstead (Low Level)

Kingscote
West Hoathly
Horsted Keynes
Sheffield Park
Newick and Chailey
Barcombe
Lewes

Rolling stock 

The Bluebell Railway preserved a number of steam locomotives before the cessation of steam service on British mainline railways in 1968. Today it has the largest collection - over 30 - of steam locomotives in the UK after the National Railway Museum (NRM). The society also has a collection of almost 150 carriages and wagons, most of them pre-war. A project is under way to recreate a long-lost type of locomotive (LB&SCR H2 class Atlantic) from a few surviving parts.

The funds were also used to: create a museum and interpretation area; create new facilities for locomotive crews; create a rainwater catchment system from the roof of the carriage building, which is then processed and used to fill the steam engines' boilers; restore the railway's historic platform buildings.

Twinning
The Bluebell Railway is twinned with the Museumstoomtram Hoorn – Medemblik, which links Hoorn and Medemblik, North Holland, the Netherlands.

References

External links 

 
 Bluebell Railway Preservation Society
 "Miss Bessemer's Crusade". Time. 20 August 1956.
 "Miss Bessemer Saves The Train" (Radio 4 drama)

 
Heritage railways in East Sussex
Heritage railways in West Sussex
Mid Sussex District
Museums in East Sussex
Railway museums in England
Standard gauge railways in England
London, Brighton and South Coast Railway